Cottonwood Technology Fund is a venture capital firm with offices in Santa Fe, New Mexico, United States, and Enschede, the Netherlands. It makes impact investments in deep tech, hardware and high tech. Cottonwood recently closed its third investment fund.

History
Cottonwood Technology Fund was founded by David Blivin in 2010 in Santa Fe, New Mexico. 

In 2014, Cottonwood expanded its operations to Europe. Its European headquarters is located on the innovation campus of the University of Twente in Enschede, the Netherlands. It is led by Alain le Loux, who is a former Member of the Executive Committee of Getronics PinkRoccade and has served as CEO of multiple startups.

In November 2020, Cottonwood announced the opening of its third investment fund. Investors in Cottonwood include Koninklijke KPN and Caterpillar.

Investments
Cottonwood Technology Fund specializes in seed stage and early stage investments in private companies.

Its portfolio is mainly in photonics, electronics, advanced materials, nanotechnology, medical technology, advanced manufacturing, robotics, clean technology and the renewable energy transition.

Cottonwood has invested in over 20 companies since 2010, including Skorpios Technologies, BayoTech, Sarcos Robotics, Infinitum Electric, SoundEnergy, OPNT and Eurekite.

In 2019, their portfolio company Exagen Inc. exited in an initial public offering (Nasdaq: XGN).

Recognition
Cottonwood is featured as one of the Most Consistent Top Performing Venture Capital Fund Managers in the Preqin Global Private Equity & Venture Capital Report 2020.

See also
Private equity
Venture capital
Deep tech
High tech

References 

Venture capital firms of the United States
Companies based in Santa Fe, New Mexico
American companies established in 2010
Financial services companies established in 2010
Privately held companies based in New Mexico
Companies of the Netherlands
Companies based in Overijssel
Privately held companies of the Netherlands
Investment management companies of the Netherlands
Investment management companies of the United States
Private equity firms of the Netherlands
Venture capital firms